Deh Sorkh or Deh-e Sorkh may refer to:

Afghanistan
 Deh Sorkh, Afghanistan

Iran
 Deh Sorkh, Hamadan
 Deh Sorkh, Isfahan
 Deh Sorkh, Javanrud, Kermanshah Province
 Deh Sorkh, Ravansar, Kermanshah Province
 Deh-e Sorkh, Lorestan
 Deh Sorkh, Razavi Khorasan
 Deh Sorkh, Ahmadabad, Razavi Khorasan Province

See also
 Deh Sorkheh (disambiguation)